Lewine is a surname. Notable people with the surname include:

Edward Lewine, American journalist, speechwriter and author
Frances Lewine (1921–2008), American journalist
Richard Lewine (1910–2005), American composer and songwriter 
Saint Lewine (5th century), British virgin and martyr
Sidney Lewine (1915–2003), American healthcare executive